Robert Jack may refer to:

 Rollo Jack (Robert Rollo Jack, 1902–1994), footballer
 Robert Jack (physicist) (1877–1957), Scottish-born physicist in New Zealand
 Robert Logan Jack (1845–1921), Queensland government geologist
 Bob Jack (1876–1943), Scottish footballer and manager

See also
Robert Jacks (1943—2014), Australian painter, sculptor and printmaker
Robert L. Jacks (1927-1987), American film producer
Robert Jacks, actor who played Leatherface in the cast of Texas Chainsaw Massacre: The Next Generation